is a railway station in  the city of Ōmachi, Nagano, Japan, operated by East Japan Railway Company (JR East).

Lines
Shinano-Kizaki Station is served by the Ōito Line and is 39.4 kilometers from the terminus of the line at Matsumoto Station.

Station layout

The station consists of two ground-level opposed side platforms connected by a level crossing. The station is unattended.

Platforms

History
Shinano-Kizaki Station opened on 25 September 1929. With the privatization of Japanese National Railways (JNR) on 1 April 1987, the station came under the control of JR East. A new station building was completed on 28 December 1999.

Surrounding area
Lake Kizaki

See also
 List of railway stations in Japan

References

External links

 JR East station information 

Railway stations in Nagano Prefecture
Ōito Line
Railway stations in Japan opened in 1929
Stations of East Japan Railway Company
Ōmachi, Nagano